The Robert E. Coyle United States Courthouse is a 9-story,  high-rise completed in 2005 in downtown Fresno, California. The building is named after U.S. District Judge Robert Everett Coyle (1930–2012), and it is one of the tallest buildings in Downtown Fresno and Central California.

References

External links
 Robert E. Coyle United States Courthouse at Moore Ruble Yudell Architects and Planners

Government buildings completed in 2005
Buildings and structures in Fresno, California
Courthouses in California
Skyscraper office buildings in California
Skyscrapers in Fresno, California